Blink is a 1993 American neo-noir thriller film directed by Michael Apted and written by Dana Stevens starring Madeleine Stowe and Aidan Quinn. Director Michael Apted was nominated for a Crystal Globe award for the film at the Karlovy Vary International Film Festival, and screenwriter Dana Stevens was nominated for Best Motion Picture at the Edgar Allan Poe Awards. Emmy Award-winning actress Laurie Metcalf also had a role in the film. Chicago rock band The Drovers played a support role as themselves, contributing three songs to the soundtrack. Stowe's character, Emma, is a fiddler in the group. Some scenes were filmed in Chicago, Illinois.

Plot

Emma Brody is a young musician who has been blind for 20 years. New surgery techniques restore her vision but initially cause "vision flashes" that leave her uncertain about what she sees. One night, she is awakened by a noise in the apartment above. Peeking out her door, she "sees" a figure descending the stairs. She contacts the police, worried that her neighbor has been murdered, but she, (and the police) are unsure whether it was just her new vision deceiving her. The killer then begins to stalk Emma.

Cast

Reception

The film received mixed to positive reviews. It holds a 64% rating on Rotten Tomatoes from 25 critics.

The Miami Herald gave the film 2.5 stars (out of 4), saying, "After a number of red herrings, the identity of the killer turns out to be rather inconsequential -- and the motive somewhat farfetched. A shame, because the premise here, paired with an equally clever plot, would've made a dandy exercise in suspense. As it is, Blink is mildly engaging entertainment, nothing that will have you checking your watch, but nowhere near as good as its terrific trailers ("Things are not what they seem" and all that) make it out to be." However, film critic Roger Ebert gave the movie three-and-a-half (of four) stars, saying "... it is an uncommonly good thriller."

Box office

The film debuted at number 4 at the US box office. It grossed $16,696,219 in the US and Canada and $21.7 million worldwide.

Year-end lists 
Dishonorable mention – Glenn Lovell, San Jose Mercury News
 Dishonorable mention – William Arnold, Seattle Post-Intelligencer

References

External links

1993 films
1990s English-language films
1993 crime thriller films
1990s mystery thriller films
1990s psychological thriller films
American crime thriller films
American mystery thriller films
American psychological thriller films
Films about blind people
Films directed by Michael Apted
Films shot in Chicago
Films set in Chicago
American neo-noir films
Films scored by Brad Fiedel
New Line Cinema films
1990s American films
Films about disability